Ala ud-din Sikandar Shah, born Humayun Khan, was the son of Sultan Muhammad Shah Tughluq. He ascended the imperial throne in virtue of his being heir apparent, as Ala-ud-din Sikandar Shah on 1 February 1394 C.E. He was a pious and devout king who never missed his namaz prayers but after one month and sixteen days he died of natural causes.

See also
Delhi Sultanate

Tughluq sultans